Nanjing Underwater World is an aquarium near the Sun Yat-sen Mausoleum in Nanjing. Underwater World is on the south side of Purple Mountain within walking distance of the Ming Xiaoling Mausoleum. The aquarium is a joint venture between Andover Capital Group and the Administration Bureau of Dr. Sun Yat-Sen’s Mausoleum.

History 

Underwater World is a joint venture between Andover Capital Group and the Nanjing government. It is run by the manager of the Sun Yat-sen Mausoleum,  and opened in 1996. The total investment was about 200,000,000 yuan.

In 2004, the Aquarium and the Dolphinarium were combined into one integrated venue.

Exhibits

Underwater World has almost 10,000 animals representing 200 species.

Ocean Tank

The ocean tank at the aquarium contains  and is home to more than 100 species of sea creatures.

Polar Region

Under the support of the Polar Exploration Office of China Marine Bureau, Polar Region displays animals from the polar regions. Visitors experience the environment and scenery of the coldest parts of the world. Photographs of Chinese expeditions to the Polar Regions are exhibited as well.

Science Education Hall

The Science Education Hall displays things that are made by most advanced technology, as well as some precious specimens of sea animals. It contains five exhibition sections:

Shell and Fossil Zone

The Shell and Fossil Zone has sea shells and fossils, including the well-known dinosaur egg fossil, which comes from 130,000,000 years ago.

Computer Interactive Zone

The Computer Interactive Zone uses multimedia to let visitors learn about the mystery in the underwater world.

Giant Insect Park

Giant Insect Park introduced some exhibits from a large park of the same name in the United States. By using advanced computer technology, to imitate the daily life of some giant insects in the forest

Underwater Leisure Square
The Underwater Leisure Square consists of a food mall and the Ocean Souvenir Supermarket.

See also
 List of tourist attractions in China

References

External links

Buildings and structures in Nanjing
Tourist attractions in Nanjing
Aquaria in China
1996 establishments in China